Brandon Toste (born October 5, 2002) is a retired Canadian figure skater, competing in singles and pairs. With his former skating partner, Brooke McIntosh, he competed at the 2019 World Junior Championships, finishing in the top ten.

Earlier in the 2018/2019 season, they placed fifth at the JGP Slovakia, tenth at the JGP Czech Republic and won silver in the junior division at the Canadian Championships.

Career

2017–2018 season 
In January 2018, McIntosh / Toste won gold in the novice division at the Canadian Championships, setting a new Canadian record (120.24).

2018–2019 season 
In the 2018–2019 season McIntosh / Toste debuted in the ISU Junior Grand Prix series. They opened the season in August at the JGP Slovakia, where they finished fifth. In September, they competed at the JGP Czech Republic, finishing tenth.

In January 2019, they won silver in the junior division at the Canadian Championships. Both also competed in the singles events (in the novice division) – McIntosh finished eighth and Toste ninth.

In March 2019, they represented Canada at the World Junior Championships, finishing tenth.

2019–2020 season 
Competing on the Junior Grand Prix for their second season, McIntosh/Toste placed fifth at the 2019 JGP United States in Lake Placid and sixth at the 2019 JGP Russia in Chelyabinsk.

These results qualified a place for a Canadian junior pair team at the 2020 Winter Youth Olympics in Lausanne, and they were subsequently selected to take that spot; as a result of which, they did not attend the 2020 Canadian Junior Championships, which overlapped with the Youth Olympics.  They placed fourth at the Youth Olympics in the pairs event, and also placed fourth in the team competition.

Following the Youth Olympics, coach Andrew Evans announced that Toste would be retiring to focus on attending university, while McIntosh would search for a new partner.

Programs

Competitive highlights 
JGP: Junior Grand Prix

Pair skating with McIntosh

Single skating

References

External links 
 
 Brooke McIntosh & Brandon Toste on the Skate Ontario website

2002 births
Living people
Canadian male pair skaters
Skating people from Ontario
Sportspeople from Mississauga
Figure skaters at the 2020 Winter Youth Olympics
21st-century Canadian people